The Star is a newspaper published in Christchurch, New Zealand. It was published daily from 1868 to 1991. It became the Christchurch Star-Sun in June 1935 after merging with a rival newspaper, The Sun, and at the time it ceased daily publication in 1991 it was known as The Christchurch Star. It later became a free newspaper, published twice a week (on Wednesdays and Fridays) until 2016, then once a week (on Thursdays) since 2016.

History 

The Star was first published on 14 May 1868 as the evening edition of the Lyttelton Times.

In April 2013 the Star was sold by APN New Zealand Media (owners of The New Zealand Herald) to Mainland Media. Mainland Media was owned by Pier and Charlotte Smulders, and chaired by Nick Smith, the director of the Dunedin–based media company Allied Press. Smith had previously worked as an advertising cadet for The Star in 1965.

In August 2018, Allied Press acquired The Star owners Star Media and its stable of community newspapers, magazines, digital platforms, and events. Following the acquisition, Charlotte Smulders remained the company's magazine publisher. Allied Press' acquisition of Star Media allowed the subsidiary to offer package buys combining the Canterbury Region with other South Island markets.

Controversies 
In 1991 The Star featured in the film JFK, with the claim that the 23 November 1963 edition of the Star, shown in the film, had published details of Lee Harvey Oswald's which the Star could only have had access to if they were pre-packaged before the assassination. The paper's chief reporter later said that this was simply wrong, as Oswald had been arrested at around 10 am New Zealand time, and the Star was not published until early to mid-afternoon New Zealand time. With access to US wire services that had photographs and biographical details from Oswald's prior defection to and return from the Soviet Union, a front page was drawn up in the time available.

In 2020 The Star faced criticism for advertising propaganda defending the Chinese Communist Party’s policies such as their systematic detention of Uighur Muslims in the Xinjiang province of China. The Star defended their continued publication of these advertisements, as it sees them as expressions of “free speech”. In response, University of Canterbury political scientist Anne-Marie Brady raised concerns that these advertisements were not making clear distinctions between opinion and fact.

References

External links
Official website

Allied Press
Star Christchurch
Publications established in 1868
Mass media in Christchurch
1868 establishments in New Zealand